Wills Classic  (or Imperial Classic as it is known in some countries) is a range of cigarettes in India, currently owned and manufactured by ITC Limited. Outside of India, it is manufactured by Imperial Tobacco.

Overview
Classic Filter Kings is a cigarette brand with a number of variants. The first Classic variant was launched in India by ITC Limited in 1979. At the time the Indian cigarette market was mainly dominated by plains and Regular Size Filter Tipped, with king size contributing barely 5% of the total market.

History

Classic was launched in 1979 and advertised as a premium brand. The company used nostalgic language in its advertisements. It became popular in the metro areas in India, especially in the north and in the east.

1990s 
During the late 1990s, the image was changed to become more global. The cigarette size was increased from 83mm to 84mm and the diameter from 24.5mm to 24.75mm. The paper quality was also improved upon. Classic Ultra Milds were introduced in 1997 The different brand variants were sold in packages with different colors.

The brand was connected to sponsorships including racing and golf. These were targeted at Westernized affluent smokers of the SEC A category. In 1996, the company began to incorporate music in their advertising, producing limited edition music packs, as well as other limited edition packs on the themes of polo and racing.

2000s 
In the 2000s, ITC Limited launched new variants, including the slimmed version Classic Verve, as well as cigarette flavored with menthol, lemon, or tea.

In 2015, the company started producing capsule cigarettes, which contained a capsule adds extra flavor to the cigarette. 
In 2016, the brand launched an innovation called Classic Low Smell

Markets
Wills Classic is mainly sold in India, but has also been sold in Paraguay, United Kingdom, Hungary, Moldova, Serbia, Albania, Greece, Ukraine, Russia, Kyrgyzstan, Kuwait, and Australia.

Products
Classic brands marketed in India include
 Classic Rich Taste (formerly Classic Regular)
 Classic Balanced Taste (Formerly Classic Milds)
 Classic Refined taste (formerly Classic Ultra Milds)
 Classic Blue Leaf
 Classic Verve
 Classic Verve Low Smell
 Classic Ice-burst
 Classic Double Burst
 Classic Low Smell
 Classic Connect

See also
 Tobacco smoking

References

Indian cigarette brands
Imperial Brands brands
Companies based in Kolkata
1979 establishments in West Bengal
ITC Limited